The Tymes are an American soul vocal group who enjoyed equal success in the United Kingdom and in their homeland. They are one of the few acts to have one and only one chart-topper in both the US and UK with different songs.

Early career
The group was formed in Philadelphia, Pennsylvania, in 1956 as the Latineers, by Donald Banks (bass), Albert Berry (first tenor), Norman Burnett (baritone), and George Hilliard (second tenor). After a four-year stint on Philadelphia's club circuit, they recruited a new lead vocalist, George Williams in 1960, and changed their name to The Tymes.

The Tymes had hits in the UK in the 1960s with songs such as "So Much in Love", a US chart topper and million-seller in 1963, "Wonderful! Wonderful!" (a remake of the Johnny Mathis classic hit from 1957), "Somewhere", then in 1970s with "You Little Trustmaker" and "Ms Grace".  The last of these became the group's biggest UK hit, reaching number one in the UK Singles Chart in 1975, but barely dented the Billboard Hot 100, long after the success of "So Much in Love". "Ms Grace", while only charting modestly in the US, was and remains a regional hit with the Carolina Beach Music scene. By 1976, Albert Berry and George Hilliard had been replaced with female singers, Terri Gonzales and Melanie Moore. Gonzales later recorded a solo album with Nile Rodgers while Moore worked as session vocalist with Kleeer and artists like Chaka Khan.

The Tymes were also The Jewels (obviously not to be confused with the R&B girl group The Jewels), as in Billy Abbott and The Jewels, whose only Hot 100 and Cashbox Top 100 entry was "Groovy Baby" in July 1963.
 
In 1963, American Bandstand signed the Tymes to Dick Clark's Caravan of Stars national US tour.

Later career
Their song "So Much in Love" was elected to the Songs of the Century in 2001. In 2005 The Tymes were inducted into the Vocal Group Hall of Fame. The Tymes continue to perform with surviving original members Berry and Burnett. The group appeared on the 2003 PBS special My Music: Love Songs of the 50s and 60s, one of the last times all five original members performed live.

Deceased members
 George Williams - born George Reginald Williams Jr, December 6, 1935, Philadelphia — died July 28, 2004, Maple Shade, New Jersey - Lead vocalist
 Donald Banks - died October 7, 2011, aged 72 - bass
 George Hilliard - died September 24, 2014, age 73 - second tenor

Discography

Studio albums

1960s singles

1970s singles

See also
List of artists who reached number one in the United States
List of artists who reached number one in Ireland
List of artists who reached number one on the UK Singles Chart
List of performers on Top of the Pops

References

External links
 Official Website
 Soulexpress.net biography
 

Musical groups established in 1956
American soul musical groups
Cameo Records artists
1956 establishments in Pennsylvania